Regimbald (died 1039) was a Benedictine abbot of Lorsch Abbey, and bishop of Speyer, from 1032. He was previously at the abbey of Saints Ulrich and Afra and at Ebersberg Abbey.

He is a Catholic and Orthodox saint, feast day 13 October.

Notes

References

1039 deaths
German Benedictines
Roman Catholic bishops of Speyer
11th-century Christian saints
Year of birth unknown
People from Dillingen an der Donau